Helen Philemon (born 28 August 1980) is a track and field athlete from Papua New Guinea. She represented her country at the 2010 Commonwealth Games and the 2014 Commonwealth Games.

Life 
Philemon was born in East New Britain Province. She represented Papua New Guinea at the 2010 Commonwealth Games in 100 metres and was a member of the 4 x 400 metre women's relay team. In 2014 she represented her country at the Commonwealth Games in 100 metres, 4 x 100 metre relay and 4 x 400 metre relay.

References

Living people
1980 births
Athletes (track and field) at the 2010 Commonwealth Games
Commonwealth Games competitors for Papua New Guinea